Ruscio may refer to:

People
Al Ruscio (1924–2013), American character actor
Kenneth P. Ruscio (born 1954), American professor of politics

Place
Ruscio, Umbria, Italy